DWEY (104.7 FM), broadcasting as 104.7 Brigada News FM, is a radio station owned and operated by Brigada Mass Media Corporation through its licensee Baycomms Broadcasting Corporation. It serves as the Luzon flagship station of Brigada News FM. The station's main broadcast studio, news center and marketing offices are located at the 5th Floor Jacinta Building 2, #1840 EDSA, Brgy. Guadalupe Nuevo, Makati, with a hybrid provincial satellite studio located at the 2nd floor, Brigada Broadcast Complex and Pharmacy, Eva Valenton Building, Evangelista St., Brgy. 23, Batangas City, and its transmitter is located at Brgy. Talumpok East, Mt. Banoy, Batangas City.

History

1998-2013: Bay Radio

It was formerly known as Bay Radio 104.7, the second FM radio station in Batangas, owned by Baycomms Broadcasting Corporation, launched in 1998, operating everyday from 4:00 a.m. to 12:00 midnight.

One of the notable activities of the station was its Hataw sa Tag-Araw done every February to June where its regular programming switched to summer-oriented shows. 2013 was its last iteration prior to acquisition.

2013-2014: Brigada takeover
On October 1, 2013, the station became part of Brigada Mass Media Corporation's acquisition and 100% gradual take-over of Baycomms Broadcasting Corporation then later underwent a soft launch with the borrowed Brigada News FM and Healthline plugs and stingers effective October 28. Prior to the soft launch, most of the in-house personnel were laid off, with some of the displaced being hired by Air1 Radio 91.9 in the process.

On February 1, 2014, 104.7 FM underwent a test broadcast with the acquisition of better transmitting facilities. On February 24, 2014, 104.7 FM formally relaunched as Brigada News FM.

Brigada continued to use the Batangas studio facility as 104.7 Brigada News FM Batangas from launch date until April 25, 2014. The broadcast team, initially, was purely consisted of the remaining Bay Radio hold-overs who did not transfer to other stations in the market. However, it mostly contained music programs and taped Brigada Healthline blocktime programs. It was only during the 1st quarter of 2014 that they started simulcasting Brigada Connection from the network's flagship station in General Santos as a dry run. In mid-April, the station went to another period of test broadcasts, this time, with its Manila link. It was at this point that all Batangas-based personnel were laid off.

2014-2017: Move To Manila
On April 28, 2014, Brigada began its operations at the Manila studio as 104.7 Brigada News FM Mega Manila, but retaining its old Batangas studio as a technical mediator relaying the entire Manila facility feed. Former Bombo Radyo Makati reporters Jun Mendoza and Jofrey Bong Cagape, and Tacloban City stalwarts Rocky Lesigues, Ley Baguio and Mellany Pacia and newcomer anchors Christopher Canlapan and Robert Lacambra Jr were shipped in to lead the first day of the station and form Manila's branch of Brigada News Team. The station also refurbished its audio system through the acquisition of the most advanced state of the art broadcast transmitter and antenna systems from Quark Electronics, that transmits the maximum authorized power and top-of-the-line audio processing equipment called “OMNIA 11”.

Brigada also expanded into a 24-hour news and music station, and completed transmitter power upgrades from 5 kW to 25 kW (ERP of 127.66 kW) with its move to Manila.

On May 22, 2014, the station started simulcasting Brigada Phone Tap (later rebranded to The Baby Nicole Show) from Cebu. It further bolstered the prominence of the kid sensation Baby Nicole, who has been enjoying popularity in the Cebuano-speaking Visayas and Mindanao. Nicole left the network in November 2015 to join Love Radio Davao and most recently, the Radyo Bandera Network.

Weng dela Peña of DZXL 558 formally joined the team on May 26, 2014. With his arrival, minor timeslot adjustments on news programs was adopted. A week later, Brigada Connection's originating broadcast transferred to Mega Manila from General Santos. The Mega Manila identification was also dropped and changed into National Broadcast Center. On June 16, 2014, Dennis Padilla joined the team, along with his program, Eat All You Can, from DZXL 558. Two weeks later, former RMN News Nationwide executive producer and DZXL anchor, Leo Navarro, joined the growing news team.

July 2014 saw many changes in the station. On July 5, 2014, Brigada Weekend Joy started its full-blown nationwide simulcast. Brigada Connection added a one-hour afternoon edition simulcast as a supplement to its morning edition. Brigada Balita also expanded to add a noontime edition. Sandy Madarcos and Aika Constantino from Brigada News FM Lucena were also brought to Manila. The station also started to bolster its Sunday programming with the debut of The Morning Sun-Gay Show running at 4:00 am and Quotes Ko 'To! at 4:00 pm. They started simulcasting Cebu City's Malala na Kaya with Kuya Helen every Sunday at 9:00 am. On July 21, 2014, the National Broadcast Center ident was simply shortened to National, citing the lengthy brand was too long to identify itself.

August 2014 saw the expansion of Brigada Connection morning slot from a half-hour to 40 minutes to accommodate more provincial reporters. Former Calabarzon stringer Jamielee de Castro of DZXL 558 was added to Brigada News Team as Batangas roving stringer.

On September 1, 2014, there was a programming change. The local Brigada Balita and Brigada Connection were merged into Brigada Balita Nationwide but cut its afternoon edition to 30 minutes. DriveMax Nationwide expanded to three hours, giving Byaheng Brigada a limited 30-minute slot. At the end of the month, Ley-Mar Baguio-Mamita and Rocky Lesigues were reassigned to Brigada News FM Puerto Princesa with the former assuming the post of station manager, while Aika Constantino moved to Daet as its main stringer. Puerto Princesa mainstay Sheryl Ann Aldave moved to Mega Manila. The station also dropped its frequency identification on September 29.

November 2014 saw the return of Brigada Connection on a separate slot, distinct of its earlier iteration prior to Brigada Balita Nationwide and transfer of Glenn Parungao of 102.7 Star FM. Quotes Ko 'To! was replaced by Magpa-MP in its afternoon slot after the latter's debut in the morning block as a dry run last October.

December 2014 saw program changes with the departure of Eat All You Can. It also went into an almost non-stop coverage of Typhoon Ruby (international name, Hagupit) from December 6–9, 2014, airing nationwide.

On March 1, 2015, the station became the number one rated in the market, a distinction which it will hold for two years. Personnel and program reshuffle continued as Lesigues and Mamita later returned to Manila by July 2015, Cagape and Mendoza moved to Brigada News FM General Santos, while Madarcos and Hermogenes moved to 93.5 Brigada News FM Olongapo and added new reporters in the likes of former Radyo5 and News5 reporter Roel Otieco, former Wish 1075 program head Bryan Quitoriano and PTV 4 anchor Hajji Kaamiño. However, talent continuity remained an issue with Otieco later promoted to 92.7 Brigada News FM Lucena as its station manager, Quitoriano's transfer to DWWW 774 and longtime station manager Weng dela Peña leaving by September 2017 and transfer to public radio station DZRB Radyo Pilipinas and later in 2019 as GMA Super Radyo DZBB 594. He was succeeded by former Aksyon Radyo 684 Bacolod mainstay Elmer Ubaldo who was hired by the station in February 2017. His tenure was carried over to the station's hybrid feed system.

2017-present: Hybrid feed
Coinciding with the respective 12th founding anniversary of the company and 9th anniversary of the establishment of its radio service, the station began implementing a hybrid feed system by transferring most of its news operation to Batangas on October 18, 2017, and reactivating the First Crown studio as its secondary provincial satellite, thereby enabling the station to break Batangas-specific news instantaneously and produce in-house reports from the province, with Jamielee de Castro being elevated to Chief of Reporters. Banat Brigada, Tira Brigada and the local Batangas bulletins transferred their production, while the remaining news and music programs continues at the Makati studio.

Elmer Ubaldo left the station on March 27, 2018, to return to Bacolod for the recently launched 103.1 Brigada News FM Bacolod since August 2018. His morning drive-time partner Angel de Vera succeeded him as station manager. By May 2018, the station relocated its twin broadcast and pharmaceutical services at the Eva Valenton Building in nearby Barangay 23. In September 2018, Canlapan left the station and transfer to Bombo Radyo Cagayan de Oro.

In June 2019, Ruel Otieco returned to the station through its Batangas studio after the Lucena City station rebranded back to Bay Radio. Gabriel Dalisay was assigned to the Makati studio.

Personnel reshuffling again occurred on December 30, 2019, when Rocky Lesigues departed the station and moved to PTV-4 by January 2020. Ex-News5 correspondent Jay de Castro and ex-PTV 4 reporter JM Reyes joined the station the same month.

On March 31, 2021, Brigada Connection Nationwide as ended the nationwide news program now extended the morning news programs as Larga Brigada Nationwide from 4:00 to 4:30 am and Larga Brigada National and the Provincial program from 4:30 to 5:40 am.

References

External links

News and talk radio stations in the Philippines
Radio stations established in 1998
Radio stations in Metro Manila
Radio stations in Batangas